Eric Gauthier Mahoto (born 21 February 1992) is a French footballer of Congolese descent who plays for AS Marsouins as a central midfielder.

Club career
Mahoto started his footballing career in France whilst playing for Le Havre. He also attended the French Football Federation's INF Clairefontaine academy. He got a growing reputation as a talented midfielder, which led to Portsmouth signing Mahoto for an undisclosed compensation fee.

Portsmouth
His initial first six months at the club were disrupted by international clearance issues. Since joining Portsmouth, he has established himself as an essential member of both the academy squad and Guy Whittingham's development side. Mahoto came on as a substitute against Rangers in a pre-season friendly.

On 25 August 2009, Mahoto made his first-team debut coming in as a substitute for Richard Hughes in Portsmouth's 4–1 victory over Hereford United in the League Cup.

Bastia
On the last day of the 2009-2010 winter transfer window, Mahoto signed a 2-and-a-half-year contract with French club SC Bastia. He did not make an appearance for Bastia however and was (confusingly) officially released by Portsmouth in August 2010 by mutual consent.

AEK and Le Mans
Mahoto spent time with AEK Athens, but only played for the reserve side. In July 2011, he joined Le Mans FC. However, he only featured for their reserve side in the CFA Group D, and left the club at the end of the season.

Atlético Baleares
In October 2012, Mahoto left France and joined CD Atlético Baleares, in Spanish third level.

References

External links
 
 
Profile at Football Prospects
Pompey pursue Mahoto
Profile at Soccer Talents

1992 births
Living people
French footballers
French expatriate footballers
French sportspeople of Democratic Republic of the Congo descent
French expatriate sportspeople in England
French expatriate sportspeople in Greece
French expatriate sportspeople in Spain
Portsmouth F.C. players
AEK Athens F.C. players
CD Atlético Baleares footballers
Olympique Saint-Quentin players
Association football midfielders
Black French sportspeople